The 1909 Bermondsey by-election was a by-election held on 28 October 1909 for the British House of Commons constituency of Bermondsey in South East London. It returned one Member of Parliament (MP)  to the House of Commons of the United Kingdom, elected by the first past the post voting system. The presiding officer and the ballots were damaged by two suffragettes who tried to disrupt the men's election.

Vacancy
The by-election was called following the death of George Cooper who had gained the seat as part of the Liberal Party victory in the 1906 general election.

Electoral history
The seat had been Liberal since they gained it at the last General Election in 1906;

Candidates
The Labour party intervened in the contest having not stood in 1906. They selected 36-year-old Alfred Salter who had recently joined the Independent Labour Party. Back in 1906, Salter had been elected in succession to Cooper as the Progressive member for Bermondsey on the London County Council. On 8 October, Salter was officially announced as the party's candidate, just one day after the death of Cooper.
The local Liberal Association selected 51-year-old journalist Spencer Leigh Hughes to defend the seat. He was not previously connected to the area and had unsuccessfully stood as Liberal candidate in the 1907 Jarrow by-election. Hughes was adopted unanimously as the candidate for the by-election. The local Liberal might have chosen Harold Glanville, a Bermondsey man who represented neighbouring Rotherhithe on the London County Council. 
With a General election pending, the Conservatives had already selected their candidate, Assheton Pownall. However, he was out of the country at the time and unable to campaign. Forced to find someone else at short notice, they settled on a local man, 64-year-old Cllr.John Dumphreys as their candidate. He had worked as a leather dresser, in an industry which was quite significant locally. In 1907 he became Mayor of Bermondsey. He was a supporter of Tariff Reform.

Campaign
Polling Day was fixed for the 28 October, just 21 days after the death of Cooper.
There was a significant speech made by Chancellor of the Exchequer, David Lloyd George, at Limehouse on 30 July 1909 in which he outlined the proposals in the People's Budget. Since then, there had been no by-election in which to gauge public reaction to these proposals. The proposals therefore became central to the campaign. The Conservatives campaigned against the radicalism of the Liberals and their idea of massive state intervention in welfare. Hughes and the local Liberals embraced this New Liberal approach. 
Dumphreys was critical of the Liberal government's failure to act on the recommendation of the Poor Law Commission, which had been initiated by the previous Conservative government. In particular, he pressed for wholesale reform of the workhouse system, for better treatment of the deserving poor, and removal of the taint of pauper from children. "For every child a chance" was his philosophy.
The Liberal campaign faced particular difficulties because their candidate was an outsider while both the Conservative and Labour candidates were local.

Result
Dumphreys gained the seat for the Conservatives and Unionists, though with less than half the votes;

Polling day had been marred by two women suffragette protesters from the Women's Freedom League, attacking polling stations, smashing bottles containing corrosive liquid over ballot boxes, in an attempt to destroy votes. A presiding officer, George Thornley, was blinded in one eye in one of these attacks, and a Liberal agent suffered a severe burn to the neck. The count was delayed while ballot papers were carefully examined, 83 ballot papers were damaged but legible but two ballot papers became undecipherable.

Aftermath
Dumphreys would lose the seat to the Liberals eleven weeks later in the general election, but not to Hughes who was to be elected as Liberal MP for Stockport, but this time to a Bermondsey man. After finishing bottom of the poll in the by-election, the Labour party withdrew from the contest; 

Salter later became MP for West Bermondsey in 1922.
The two suffragette protesters Alice Chapin and Alison Neilans, were sentenced to three months each in Holloway Prison.

References

 Craig, F. W. S. (1974). British parliamentary election results 1885-1918 (1 ed.). London: Macmillan.
 Who's Who: www.ukwhoswho.com
 Debrett's House of Commons 1916

Bermondsey by-election
Bermondsey,1909
Bermondsey by-election
Bermondsey,1909
Bermondsey
Bermondsey by-election